St Patrick's High School is a Roman Catholic non-selective, mixed secondary school in Keady, County Armagh, Northern Ireland that was founded in 1970 by the De La Salle Brothers.

History
The school was founded in 1970 by the De La Salle Brothers to educate pupils from Derrynoose, Keady, Madden, Ballymacnab, Granemore, Clady and Middletown, County Armagh. St Patrick's now also has students from Armagh and Monaghan. Upon opening the school had 450 pupils and 22 teachers which has now grown to an enrolment of 1015 pupils, which includes 240 Sixth Form pupils, and 70 Members of Staff.

In September 2000, St. Patrick's moved into a new purpose-built school with facilities including a 500 square metre sports hall, assembly hall, drama studio, lecture theatre, and oratory. The school has since been further enhanced with the completion of the Keady Recreation Centre. As part of this innovative ‘Dual Use Scheme’ with Armagh City and District Council (Armagh City, Banbridge and Craigavon Borough Council), the school now has a synthetic pitch with floodlighting, a pavilion with a meeting room, a grass pitch and a two floor fitness suite. The latest addition to the school was a sixth-form study centre.

Staff
The first principal of the school was Brother Gerard Deegan who led the school for nine years. His successor was Brother Francis Manning, principal from 1979-1980.

Mr Patrick McAleavey OBE became principal in 1980, and was in the role until September 2010 when he retired. Having been a teacher in the school for ten years previously, Mr McAleavey was part of the school for a total of forty years. He was integral to promoting the school to one of the top five non-grammar secondary schools in Northern Ireland.

Pat McGuckian was appointed as new principal in April 2011. She was previously the vice-principal of St. Malachy's College, in Belfast. She resigned in April 2018. She was replaced by Dr Fionnuala Moore who had been Vice Principal of St Ronan’s College, Lurgan.

Senior Leadership Team
Principal - Dr. Fionnuala Moore
Vice Principal - Mrs. K McKenna 
Vice Principal - Mrs. G Lundy
Senior Teacher in Charge of Sixth Form - Mrs. B Finn and Mrs. L Kelly 
Senior Teacher in Charge of Year 12 - Mrs. E King and Mrs. G Lundy
Senior Teacher in Charge of Year 11 - Mrs. M Carr and Mrs. M Moriarty
Senior Teacher in Charge of Year 10 - Mrs. N Corr and Mrs. M Rafferty 
Senior Teacher in Charge of Year 9 - Mrs. M O'Neil and Mr. S Mcgeary 
Senior Teacher in Charge of Year 8 - Mrs. A O'Connor and Mr. C Furphy

Academics
The school has been acknowledged as one of the top non-selective secondary schools in Northern Ireland for many years. In 2018, 91.3% of its entrants achieved five or more GCSEs at grades A* to C, including the core subjects English and Maths. Also in 2018, 66% of its entrants to the A-level exam achieved A*-C grades.

Key Stage 3
Students at Key Stage 3 in St Patrick's are offered the following subjects in line with the Northern Ireland curriculum: English, Maths, Science, Religion, Geography, History, Irish, French, Spanish, Technology and Design, Art and Design, Physical Education (P.E.), I.C.T., Music, Drama, Home Economics, Citizenship and Employability, Careers Awareness and Personal Health and Social Education (PHSE).

Key Stage 4
At GCSE level, all pupils must study the core subjects of English Language, Mathematics, Science and Religious Education. Pupils may then choose from a number of subjects including: Double/Single Award Science (Biology, Chemistry and Physics), English Literature, French, Irish, History, Geography, Home Economics, Music, Art and Design, Physical Education (P.E.), I.C.T., Technology and Design, Economics, Business Studies, Motor Vehicle and Road User Studies (M.V.R.U.S.), Learning for Work and Life (LLW), Child Development, Construction, and Occupational Studies (VEP), Moving Image Arts.

Sixth Form
At A-level, St Patrick's offers many of the subjects at Key Stage 4 alongside; Applied Business Studies, Double Award Applied Business Studies, Biology, Chemistry, Physics, Travel and Tourism, Moving Image Art, Economics, Key Skills (Communication, Application of Number and I.C.T) and Certificate of Personal Effectiveness (C.O.P.E). Students may choose three or four A-Level and/or AS courses.

Sports
St Patrick's has been active in the sporting field with all sports and from all age ranges, including;
Football
Athletics
Gaelic Games - Gaelic, Hurling and Camogie
Golf
Netball
Swimming
Basketball

Sporting Achievements include:
Ulster Senior Hurling Champions in 2011/2012, 2007/2008, 2005/2006 (Casement Cup)
Ulster Senior Camogie Champions in 2011/2012
All-Stars in camogie, hurling and athletics
Under 14 camogie finalists in 2010/2011
Third place in Cross Country in Ulster in 2012
Year 8 Gaelic Football winners in 2010/2011 (McQuillan Cup)
Irish News, sporting school of the year in 2010
U14 Gaelic and U14 Camogie Teams were crowned "TEAM OF THE YEAR" of Armagh
Ulster Year 9 Gaelic football winners in 2010/2011 (Corn Colmcille Cup)

References

External links
 

Catholic secondary schools in Northern Ireland
Secondary schools in County Armagh
Armagh
Educational institutions established in 1970
1970 establishments in Northern Ireland